The Montevideo tree frog (Boana pulchella) is a species of frog in the family Hylidae found in eastern, central, and northern  Argentina, south-eastern Brazil, south-eastern Paraguay, and Uruguay. It is a common species occurring in open habitats in forests, grasslands, and flooded savannas. Breeding takes place in permanent ponds and flooded grasslands.

The diet of Argentinean Boana pulchella was found to consist mostly of spiders, dipterans and, crickets. During the cold time of the year, these frogs continue to feed at high rate, instead of partly relying on their fat reserves as the sympatric Dendropsophus nanus do.

References

Boana
Amphibians of Argentina
Amphibians of Brazil
Amphibians of Paraguay
Amphibians of Uruguay
Amphibians described in 1841
Taxa named by André Marie Constant Duméril
Taxa named by Gabriel Bibron
Taxonomy articles created by Polbot